William Brockman Bankhead (April 12, 1874 – September 15, 1940) was an American politician who served as the 42nd speaker of the United States House of Representatives from 1936 to 1940, representing Alabama's 10th and later 7th congressional districts as a Democrat from 1917 to 1940. Bankhead was a strong liberal and a prominent supporter of President Franklin Roosevelt's New Deal of pro-labor union legislation, thus clashing with most other Southern Democrats in Congress at the time. Bankhead described himself as proud to be a politician, by which he meant that he did not neglect matters that concerned his district or reelection. He was the father of actress Tallulah Bankhead.

Bankhead died on September 15, 1940, from an abdominal hemorrhage, while still in office.

Early life

Bankhead was born at the Bankhead plantation in Lamar County, Alabama. His father, John H. Bankhead, was an active politician who had served in the Alabama legislature, and later as US Representative and Senator. His mother was Tallulah James Brockman, granddaughter of South Carolina state Senator Thomas Patterson Brockman, and he was raised as a Methodist. Bankhead's brother, John H. Bankhead II, also served in the Senate.

William Bankhead attended the University of Alabama, where he was a member of Phi Delta Theta fraternity, and played on the university's first football team, organized in 1892. He studied law at Georgetown University Law Center in Washington, DC, graduating in 1895.

He was immediately admitted to the bar in Alabama, and practiced law in Huntsville.

Political career
In 1898, he became city attorney of Huntsville, serving until 1902. In 1900, he was elected to the Alabama House of Representatives for one term, serving through 1901.

In 1905, he moved to Jasper, Alabama. In 1910 he was appointed solicitor of the fourteenth judicial circuit of Alabama, serving until 1914.

In 1914, he sought the Democratic nomination for US Representative, but failed. In 1916 he was elected Representative from the newly created 10th Congressional District. (Alabama was apportioned a tenth Congressional seat after the 1910 Census, but the seat was filled by at-large election in 1912 and 1914.) Bankhead held the 10th District until it was abolished after the 1930 Census, when Alabama lost a seat. He was the only person ever elected from the 10th District.

After reapportionment and redistricting following the 1930 Census, Bankhead was re-elected Representative from the 7th District in 1932, and was re-elected three times, serving until his death in 1940. Bankhead served as chairman of the House Rules Committee from April 1934 until January 1935, taking over for Edward W. Pou who died in office. In 1934, he was chosen House Majority Leader by his fellow Democrats. On June 4, 1936, he was chosen Speaker of the House to succeed Jo Byrns, who had died that morning. Bankhead served as Speaker until his death on September 15, 1940. His cause of death was a stomach hemorrhage.

As Speaker, Bankhead held the second-highest political office ever attained by any Alabamian, after only Vice President William R. King.

At the 1940 Democratic National Convention (three months before his death), he finished second to Henry A. Wallace on the vice presidential ticket, losing the delegate count 626–329.

Bankhead family
Bankhead's father, John H. Bankhead, was a U.S. Representative and Senator. His elder brother John H. Bankhead II was also a U.S. Senator, and his nephew Walter Will Bankhead was a U.S. Representative. His daughter, Tallulah Bankhead, was the acclaimed theatrical, radio and motion picture actress.

The William B. Bankhead National Forest and sections of old US Highway 78 in northern Alabama are named in his honor. His home in Jasper has been renovated to house the Walker Area Community Foundation's "Bankhead House and Heritage Center", a history museum and arts venue.

See also

 List of United States Congress members who died in office (1900–49)

References
Grossman, Mark, "Speakers of the House of Representatives 1789-2009" (New York: Grey House Publishing, 2009).

External links

|-

|-

|-

|-

|-

1874 births
1940 deaths
20th-century American politicians
Alabama Crimson Tide football players
Methodists from Alabama
American people of Scotch-Irish descent
Bankhead family
Democratic Party members of the United States House of Representatives from Alabama
Georgetown University Law Center alumni
Majority leaders of the United States House of Representatives
Politicians from Huntsville, Alabama
People from Lamar County, Alabama
Speakers of the United States House of Representatives
1940 United States vice-presidential candidates
University of Alabama alumni
Lawyers from Huntsville, Alabama